Charisse is a feminine given name. Notable people with the name include:

Charisse Arrington, R&B singer who was signed to MCA Records in the 1990s
Charisse Anne Hernandez-Alcantara, Filipino politician 
Charisse Jones, African American journalist and essayist
Charisse Melany Moll (born 1985), Miss Suriname 2007
Charisse Millett (born 1964), American politician
Cyd Charisse (1921–2008), American dancer and actress
Lady Charisse Estrada, Miss Continental Elite 2014

See also
Charice Pempengco (born 1992), Filipina singer 

English feminine given names